John W. Jones may refer to:

Political figures
 John William Jones (1806–1871), U.S. congressman from Georgia
 John Winston Jones (1791–1848), U.S. congressman from Virginia
 John Walter Jones (1878–1954), Canadian Premier of Prince Edward Island, 1943–1953
 John Walter Jones (Wales), chief executive of the Welsh Language Board, 1993
 John W. Jones (Alabama politician), state legislator in Alabama

Others
 John W. Jones (ex-slave) (1817–1900), notable ex-slave
 John W. Jones (artist), American artist
 Lam Jones (John Wesley Jones, born 1958), U.S. sprinter and professional American football player
 J.W. Jones (1894–1979), Northwest Missouri State University president

See also
John Jones (disambiguation)